Afriqiyah Airways ( Al-Khuṭūṭ al-Jawwiyyah al-Afrīqiyyah) is a Libyan state-owned airline based in Tripoli, Libya. Before the 17 February 2011 revolution, it operated domestic services between Tripoli and Benghazi, and international scheduled services to over 25 countries in Europe, Africa, Asia and the Middle East; since the end of the war, it has been seeking to rebuild its business. Afriqiyah Airways' main base is technically Tripoli International Airport, although it has been closed since 2014 and flights are operating as much as possible from other airports.

History

Establishment and growth: 2001-2011

Afriqiyah Airways was established in April 2001 and commenced scheduled services on 1 December 2001. The name Afriqiyah comes from the Arabic word for African. It is wholly owned by the Libyan government and has 287 employees (at March 2007). The airline started with Boeing 737-400 aircraft, but in 2003, an all-Airbus fleet was introduced. The Italian airline Blue Panorama jointly set up the airline with the Libyan government. Afriqiyah Airways is one of the few airlines which doesn't serve alcoholic beverages on its flights.

The airline generated US$120 million in revenue in 2006.

Afriqiyah Airways signed a Memorandum of Understanding for the purchase of six Airbus A320s and three Airbus A319s plus an option on five, as well as for three Airbus A330-200s, with an option for three.

The new A320s and A319s entered service on Afriqiyah's growing international network, covering routes from its base at Tripoli to seventeen destinations in North, West, and Central Africa and the Middle East, as well as to European destinations such as Paris, Brussels, London, Rome, and Amsterdam. Afriqiyah's A319s carry 124 passengers in a two-class configuration, while the A320 seats 144 in two class configurations (J16/Y128). The A330s serve the long-distance operations on routes to Southern Africa, Asia and Europe, and have a two-class configuration with 230 seats (J30/Y200). As of 2015 the airline no longer flies to some of these destinations anymore.

On 20 August 2009, an Air Afriqiyah aircraft (registration 5A-IAY) - the private aircraft of Colonel Gaddafi - flew to Glasgow Airport to collect Abelbasset al-Megrahi (who had been convicted of the 1988 Lockerbie bombing and released on compassionate grounds by the Cabinet Secretary for Justice in the Scottish Government). He was flown directly from Glasgow to Tripoli.

Three A330s that were delivered in 2009 were used to inaugurate new routes to Dhaka, Johannesburg and Kinshasa. In the winter 2010, two new routes were added to the airline's network - Beijing and Nouakchott.

In mid-October 2010, Afriqiyah Airways and Libyan Airlines (Libya's other state flag carrier) were expected to merge into one airline, and, although postponed, the merger is still planned.

Suspended operations: 2011
As a consequence of the Libyan Civil War and the resulting no-fly zone over the country enforced by NATO, in accordance with the United Nations Security Council Resolution 1973, all flight operations by Afriqiyah Airways were terminated on 17 March 2011.

Point 17 of the United Nations resolution specifically banned flights into members of the United Nations by aircraft registered in Libya (5A). This was to have been rescinded when Afriqiyah Airways was officially 'unsanctioned' on 22 September 2011, when Libyan-registered aircraft should have been again permitted to enter EU airspace. This did not happen and up to 5 March 2013 however no such easing had been announced and Libyan-registered aircraft are still banned from Europe, even overflying through the airspace. The Tripoli - Istanbul route has to route further east, via over Alexandria, which adds an hour each way to the sector time. Afriqiyah Airways announced that they expected to resume flights between Tripoli and London by the end of the year, subject to the issuance of air transport and security permits, using A320 equipment. However, flights did not resume until 3 July 2012. In order to get round the EU ban, Afriqiyah wet-leased an A320 (ER-AXP) from Air Moldova that complied with the EU requirements.

Rebuilding post-war services: 2012 onwards

After suffering badly during the civil war, Afriqiyah Airways expressed renewed optimism in the future on 12 November 2012 when it increased its order for Airbus A350 aircraft, announcing a new firm order for four A350-900s, and converting its original order for six A350-800s to six of the larger A350-900 model, taking the total number of A350s on order to 10 A350-900s. Deliveries were scheduled to start in 2020, and the airline planned to deploy the aircraft on new routes to the United States, the Middle East and Asia.

On 19 December 2012, the airline unveiled its new livery, featuring a white fuselage and black tail fin adorned with three blue stripes, representing the neck markings of the turtle dove. The design replaced the former 9.9.99 tail fin logo.

The airline's hub, Tripoli International Airport, was shut down on 13 July 2014 and remains closed to all passenger and cargo flights as of July 2020. Afriqiyah Airways instead currently operates a small route network out of Mitiga International Airport.

Corporate affairs

Ownership
Afriqiyah Airways is a subsidiary of the Libyan African Aviation Holding Company (LAAHC), itself owned by the Libyan National Social Fund, the Libyan National Investment Company, the Libya-Africa Investment Fund and the Libyan Foreign Investment Company; the airline is ultimately owned by the Libyan government. LAAHC is also the holding company for Libyan Airlines; although separate operations, a merger of the two carriers had been progressing slowly, though completion of the merger, expected in the first half of 2013 appear to have repeatedly been delayed, and in June 2014 it was reported that the merger was "not currently being worked on".

Corporate identity

The Gaddafi-era 9.9.99 logo on the side of Afriqiyah's aircraft referred to the date of the Sirte Declaration, signed on 9 September 1999. The declaration marked the formation of the African Union. On Muammar Gaddafi's orders, the date was placed on the fuselage of all of the aircraft when the airline was founded. Tom Little of the Libya Herald said "Gaddafi saw the declaration as one of his proudest achievements".

In 2012, the airline decided to use new branding to replace the previous one's association with Gaddafi. Saeed Al-Barouni, In-Flight Services and Catering Manager, created a new logo that was selected from a pool of sixty proposals. The logo, made up of three blue stripes, is based on the neck markings of turtle doves. The new branding was unveiled on 19 December 2012 at the Rixos Al Nasr Hotel in Tripoli.

Business trends
Scant management data for Afriqiyah Airways have been published, even before the civil war of 2011. Mainly based on statements by airline or government officials, or AFRAA reports, trends for recent years are shown below (for years ending 31 December):

Destinations

As of August 2016, Afriqiyah Airways operates a small network to destinations in Northern Africa as well as Istanbul in Turkey. Until the outbreak of the civil war, it used to serve several more destinations in Africa, Asia and Europe.

Fleet

Current fleet
, the Afriqiyah Airways fleet consists of an all-Airbus fleet made up of the following aircraft:

Historical fleet
 Airbus A300
 Boeing 737-400

An Airbus A340-200, registration 5A-ONE was painted in the airline colors and operated as a private jet for Libyan leader Muammar Gaddafi from 2003 to 2011 fitted with a luxurious VIP interior. It was damaged during the battle at Tripoli International Airport. It has been stored since March 2014 at Perpignan-Rivesaltes Airport, France, still in Afriqiyah colors.

Accidents and incidents

 On 12 May 2010, at 04:10 UTC (06:10 Tripoli time) Flight 771, an Airbus A330-202, flying from Johannesburg in South Africa to Tripoli, crashed on approach to Tripoli airport. 11 crew members and 93 passengers were killed. The sole survivor was a nine-year-old Dutch boy.
 On 25 August 2011, two Afriqiyah jets were caught in the middle of a crossfire battle at Tripoli Airport. The former, an Airbus A300B4 registered 5A-IAY, was totalled and written off when a grenade hit the aircraft, while an Airbus A320, 5A-ONK, bore severe damage when an RPG hit the wing root, possibly puncturing the centre wing tank in the process.
 On 20 July 2014, two Airbus A330 aircraft with registrations 5A-ONF and 5A-ONP were hit by rockets fired by one of the rival militias (Misratah and Zintan) fighting for control of the facility at Tripoli International Airport. 5A-ONF exploded, burned to the ground and was written off; however, 5A-ONP suffered minor to moderate damage, and was stored for repair.
On 23 December 2016, Flight 209 from Sebha Airport to Mitiga International Airport, operated by Airbus A320 5A-ONB, was hijacked and diverted to Luqa Airport, Malta.

References

External links

 Official website
 Afriqiyah Airways at ATDB: profile, history and events, contacts and management, historical/current/planned aircraft in fleets

 
Airlines banned in the European Union
Airlines established in 2001
Airlines of Libya
Arab Air Carriers Organization members
Government-owned airlines
Organizations based in Tripoli, Libya
2001 establishments in Libya